The Outer Marker is the debut album by the British recording artist Just Jack. The album failed to enter the UK Top 40 and did not chart in the US. However it did win critical acclaim.

Track listing
 "Let's Get Really Honest" – 3:58
 "Paradise (Lost & Found)" – 3:41
 "Lesson One" – 2:45
 "Snowflakes" – 4:54
 "Deep Thrills" – 4:33
 "Heartburn" – 4:36
 "Eye to Eye" (featuring Sammy D) – 3:35
 "Contradictions" – 5:08
 "Snapshot Memories" – 5:19
 "Triple Tone Eyes" – 4:13
 "Ain't Too Sad" – 4:52
 "Snowflakes" [Cured by Temple of Jay Mix] – 4:17
 "Snowflakes" [Dan the Automator Remix] – 4:30

Just Jack albums
2002 debut albums